is a railway station on the Kōnan Railway Kōnan Line in Hirosaki, Aomori, Japan, operated by the private railway operator Kōnan Railway Company.

Lines

Station layout
Nisato Station has a one island platform. The station building is connected to the platform by a level crossing and is unattended.

Platforms

Adjacent stations

History
Nisato Station was opened on September 7, 1927, as a signal stop. It was elevated to a full station on September 18, 1951. It became a kan'i itaku station in October 1968. Freight operations were discontinued in 1971. The station was unattended from July 1972 until April 1973, and again from November 1987 to the present.

Surrounding area
A JGR Class 8620 locomotive on display outside the station.

See also
 List of railway stations in Japan

External links

 
Location map 

Railway stations in Aomori Prefecture
Konan Railway
Hirosaki
Railway stations in Japan opened in 1927